The Sony E 35mm F1.8 OSS is a constant aperture standard prime lens for the Sony E-mount, released by Sony on September 12, 2012.

Build quality 
The lens has a black plastic exterior in a high quality finish. Its autofocus is fast and silent.

Image quality 
Wide open the sharpness of the lens is about average in the corners and good in the center but stopping down sharpness increases reaching its sweet-spot at 5.6.

Distortion is very low (barrel shaped), vignetting mild wide open. Chromatic aberrations are visible especially when shooting against the sun.

Bokeh is soft especially wide open. Colour rendition is neutral.

See also
List of Sony E-mount lenses
Sony Carl Zeiss Sonnar T* FE 35mm F2.8 ZA
Samyang Optics / Rokinon AF 35 mm f/2.8 FE

References

Camera lenses introduced in 2012
35